JFK, or in full form John F. Kennedy, (1917–1963) was the president of the United States from 1961 to 1963.

JFK may also refer to:

Transportation
 John F. Kennedy International Airport, New York City, IATA code and common name JFK
Howard Beach–JFK Airport station
Sutphin Boulevard–Archer Avenue–JFK Airport station
 JFK/UMass station, in Boston, Massachusetts
 John F. Kennedy Memorial Airport, or JFK Memorial Airport, Ashland, Wisconsin
 , two U.S. Navy ships
 MV John F. Kennedy, Staten Island Ferry

Arts and entertainment
 JFK (film), 1991
 JFK (soundtrack)
 JFK (opera), 2016
 JFK (Clone High), a fictional character 
 "JFK", a song by Azealia Banks from the 2011 album Broke with Expensive Taste

Education
 JFK International School, in Saanen, Switzerland
 JFK University, in Pleasant Hill, California, U.S.
 JFK College, in Wahoo, Nebraska, U.S.
 John F. Kennedy High School (disambiguation)

See also

 John F. Kennedy (disambiguation)
 John F. Kennedy Stadium (disambiguation)
 JFK Medical Center (disambiguation)
 JFK Express, a former New York subway service
 JFK Reloaded, a 2004 video game 
 KJFK (disambiguation), including stations in zone K called JFK
 WJFK (disambiguation), including stations in zone W called JFK